Bernt "Sump-Hugo" Andersson (5 September 1933 – 6 January 2020) was a Swedish football player and manager. A midfielder, he made 91 Allsvenskan appearances for Djurgårdens IF and scored 19 goals.

Honours
Djurgårdens IF
 Allsvenskan: 1954–55, 1964

References

1933 births
2020 deaths
Association football midfielders
Swedish footballers
Swedish football managers
Sundbybergs IK players
Djurgårdens IF Fotboll players
Halmstads BK managers
Vasalunds IF managers
Helsingborgs IF managers
Älvsjö AIK managers
Allsvenskan players
Place of birth missing